Arne Gurstad Riis (June 21, 1923 – April 29, 2009) was a Norwegian actor.

Riis was engaged with the New Theater from 1949 to 1957. In addition, Riis appeared in eleven film and television roles. He made his screen debut in 1951 in Edith Carlmar's film Skadeskutt. In the 1960s Riis worked for NRK's Television Theater. He played his last television role in 1982 as a Norwegian in the Swedish TV series Polisen som vägrade svara.

Riis was married to the singer Nora Brockstedt.

Filmography
1951: Skadeskutt as Holst, an engineer
1952: Det kunne vært deg as the mailman
1958: I slik en natt as a man at the border
1958: Ut av mørket

NRK Television Theater
1961: Frisøndag
1961: Den anstendige skjøgen
1962: Hånden på hjertet
1963: Særlingen
1965: Frydenberg
1965: Raude roser åt meg
1965: Smeltedigelen

TV series
1982: Polisen som vägrade svara

References

External links
 
 Arne Riis at Sceneweb
 Arne Riis at Filmfront

1923 births
2009 deaths
20th-century Norwegian male actors